Hyidiothrips is a genus of thrips in the family Phlaeothripidae.

Species
 Hyidiothrips atomarius
 Hyidiothrips brunneus
 Hyidiothrips guangdongensis
 Hyidiothrips hiromiae
 Hyidiothrips japonicus
 Hyidiothrips malayanus
 Hyidiothrips nanellus
 Hyidiothrips nirasawae
 Hyidiothrips sulawesicus
 Hyidiothrips tesselatus

References

Phlaeothripidae
Thrips
Thrips genera